Johnny Frenchman is a 1945 British comedy-drama romance war film produced by Ealing Studios and directed by Charles Frend.  The film was produced by Michael Balcon from a screenplay by T. E. B. Clarke, with cinematography by Roy Kellino.

Plot
The film is set at the onset and first months of the Second World War, between March 1939 and June 1940, in a small fishing port in Cornwall, whose inhabitants have an historic, but largely benign, rivalry with their counterparts from a port over the Channel in Brittany in northern France, whose fishing boats fish the same grounds - in this case looking for crabs.  Legally the French may not fish within a three-mile limit of the British coast, and vice versa, and breaches of this rule are the cause of frequent spats between the two countries. In this instance, hot-headed Cornish harbour-master Nat Pomeroy confronts Lanec Florrie, an equally redoubtable widow in charge of an otherwise male crew, from a Breton port. Beneath all the bluster and posturing however, there is a mutual understanding and respect between the two communities.

Widower Nat's daughter, Sue Pomeroy, has been friends since childhood with local boy Bob Tremayne, and their eventual marriage has been taken as a foregone conclusion.  During a visit by the Cornish contingent to Brittany a wrestling match is arranged between Bob and Lanec's son Yan, during which Yan breaks a bone, to the concern of Sue.  Yan is attracted to Sue and begins actively to woo her, with great success.  Sue is torn between her own attraction to Yan and her unspoken commitment to Bob, a situation which leads to increased friction between the two communities.  However, when war-related danger ensues, both sides realise that their unity in common cause against the mutual German enemy, and that it is more important than petty squabbles.  Bob is called up to serve in the British navy, and in a showdown conversation with Yan before he leaves, the two agree that Sue must be allowed to follow her own heart.

Yan comes to Cornwall to also serve in war duties.

With most men absent, a loose sea mine drifts into the Cornish harbour and Lanec bravely mans a ship to net it and tow it out, making her a local hero and easing the tensions. She eventually pushes Sue and Yan to marry, which they do without Pomeroy's consent.

Cast

 Tom Walls as Nat Pomeroy
 Patricia Roc as Sue Pomeroy
 Françoise Rosay as Lanec Florrie
 Paul Dupuis as Yan Kervarec
 Ralph Michael as Bob Tremayne
 Arthur Hambling as Steven Matthews
 James Harcourt as Joe Pender
 Grace Arnold as Mrs. Matthews
 Beatrice Varley as Mrs. Tremayne
 Drusilla Wills as Miss Bennett
 Judith Furse as June Matthews
 Frederick Piper as Zacky Penrose
 Richard George as Charlie West
 Bill Blewitt as Dick Trewhiddle
 James Knight as Tom Hocking

Location filming
The film's exterior sequences were shot in the Cornish fishing port of Mevagissey.

References

TimeOut Film Guide - published by Penguin Books -

External links 

 
 
Review of film at Variety

1945 films
1945 drama films
British black-and-white films
Ealing Studios films
Films about fishing
Films directed by Charles Frend
Films produced by Michael Balcon
Films scored by Clifton Parker
Films set in Cornwall
Films set in France
British World War II films
British drama films
Films shot in Cornwall
1940s English-language films
1940s British films